One third of Winchester City Council in Hampshire, England is elected each year, followed by one year without election. Since the last boundary changes in 2016, 55 councillors have been elected from 16 wards, there having previously been 57 councillors have been elected from 26 wards from 2002.

Political control
Since the first election to the council in 1973 political control of the council has been held by the following parties:

Leadership
The role of mayor of Winchester is now largely ceremonial, with political leadership instead provided by the leader of the council. The leaders since 1994 have been:

Council elections
1973 Winchester City Council election
1976 Winchester City Council election (New ward boundaries)
1979 Winchester City Council election
1980 Winchester City Council election
1982 Winchester City Council election
1983 Winchester City Council election
1984 Winchester City Council election
1986 Winchester City Council election (City boundary changes took place but the number of seats remained the same)
1987 Winchester City Council election
1988 Winchester City Council election
1990 Winchester City Council election
1991 Winchester City Council election
1992 Winchester City Council election
1994 Winchester City Council election
1995 Winchester City Council election
1996 Winchester City Council election
1998 Winchester City Council election
1999 Winchester City Council election
2000 Winchester City Council election
2002 Winchester City Council election (New ward boundaries increased the number of seats by 2)
2003 Winchester City Council election
2004 Winchester City Council election
2006 Winchester City Council election
2007 Winchester City Council election
2008 Winchester City Council election
2010 Winchester City Council election
2011 Winchester City Council election
2012 Winchester City Council election
2014 Winchester City Council election
2015 Winchester City Council election
2016 Winchester City Council election (New ward boundaries)
2018 Winchester City Council election
2019 Winchester City Council election
2021 Winchester City Council election
2022 Winchester City Council election

District result maps
N.b. White denotes no election held in ward that year; 2011 results are missing

By-election results

1997-2001

2001-2005

2005-2009

2009-2013

2017-2021

References

By-election results

External links
Winchester City Council

 
Politics of Winchester
Council elections in Hampshire
District council elections in England